The inaugural 1877 Men's tennis tour  was composed of five tournaments for the second edition pre-open era tour. Before the birth of Open Era (tennis), most tournaments were reserved for amateur athletes. In 1874 British Major Walter Clopton Wingfield patented with the House of London Crafts the invention of a new game, which consisted of a shaped field hourglass, divided in the middle by a suspended net. The game was packaged in a box containing some balls, four paddles, the net components and the signs to mark the field. The game was based on the rules of the old real tennis and, at the suggestion of Arthur Balfour, was called lawn-tennis. The official date of birth of the court would be February 23, 1874. In 1877 all were amateur tournaments, among them was the first 1877 Wimbledon Championship, the inaugural event was held from 9 to 19 July and saw as the inaugural winner Spencer Gore. The tournament would remain for a period of 35 years the sole major tennis tournament in the world until the International Lawn Tennis Federation introduces its three World championship series events in 1913 that continue until 1923, when the U.S. Lawn Tennis Association (f. 1881) only agrees to join the ILTF on the basis of two compromises: the title 'World Championships' would be abolished and wording would be 'for ever in the English language'. Wimbledon would still retain its prestigious and historical status, and become one of the four Grand Slam tennis events from 1924.

Whilst Wimbledon was the most prominent event of this inaugural new sport season in Ireland two other tournaments were also staged, one taking place in Waterford and the other was University of Dublin Lawn Tennis Championships.

Calendar 
Notes 1: Challenge Round: the final round of a tournament, in which the winner of a single-elimination phase faces the previous year's champion, who plays only that one match. The challenge round was used in the early history of tennis (from 1877 through 1921), in some tournaments not all.* Indicates challenger
Notes 2:Tournaments in italics were events that were staged only once that season

Key

January to June 
No events

July

August 
No events

September

October

November to December 
No events

List of tournament winners 
Important tournament in bold
  Spencer Gore–Wimbledon–(1)
  Richard Manders– Dublin–(1)
 Clement Edward Cottrell–Esher–(1)
  Vere St. Leger Goold–Waterford–(1)

See also 
 1877 in Tennis
 1877 in sports

References

Sources 

 A Social History of Tennis in Britain: Lake, Robert J. (2014), Volume 5 of Routledge Research in Sports History. Routledge, UK, .
 Ayre's Lawn Tennis Almanack And Tournament Guide, 1908 to 1938, A. Wallis Myers.
 British Lawn Tennis and Squash Magazine, 1948 to 1967, British Lawn Tennis Ltd, UK.
 Dunlop Lawn Tennis Almanack And Tournament Guide, G.P. Hughes, 1939 to 1958, Dunlop Sports Co. Ltd, UK
 Lawn tennis and Badminton Magazine, 1906 to 1973, UK.
 Lowe's Lawn Tennis Annuals and Compendia, Lowe, Sir F. Gordon, Eyre & Spottiswoode
 Spalding's Lawn Tennis Annuals from 1885 to 1922, American Sports Pub. Co, USA.
 Sports Around the World: History, Culture, and Practice, Nauright John and Parrish Charles, (2012), ABC-CLIO, Santa Barbara, Cal, US, .
 Tennis; A Cultural History, Gillmeister Heiner, (1997), Leicester University Press, Leicester, UK.
 The Tennis Book, edited by Michael Bartlett and Bob Gillen, Arbor House, New York, 1981 
 The World of Tennis Annuals, Barrett John, 1970 to 2001.
 Total Tennis:The Ultimate Tennis Encyclopedia, by Bud Collins, Sport Classic Books, Toronto, Canada, 
 Wright & Ditson Officially Adopted Lawn Tennis Guide's 1890 to 1920 Wright & Ditsons Publishers, Boston, Mass, USA.
 https://app.thetennisbase.com/Men's 1877 season

External links 
 https://thetennisbase.com/1877 Men's season

Pre Open era tennis seasons
1877 Men's Tennis season